Tenellia millenae is a species of sea slug, an aeolid nudibranch, a marine gastropod mollusc in the family Fionidae.

Distribution
This species was described from Islas Revillagigedo, Colima, Mexico in the tropical eastern Pacific region.

References 

Fionidae
Gastropods described in 2007